Raiske may refer to several places in Ukraine:

 Raiske (urban-type settlement), Donetsk Oblast
 Raiske (village), Donetsk Oblast
 Raiske, Kherson Oblast
 Raiske, Zaporizhzhia Oblast